Creative Loafing is a U.S. city monthly paper serving the Atlanta metropolitan area covering local news, politics, arts, entertainment, food, music and events. Its weekly print circulation is 70,000, and its cumulative readership in print is 477,000 according to Scarborough Feb 2014 - Jan 2015 study, and the website creativeloafing.com draws nearly 500,000 visitors monthly according to Google Analytics.

Founded in 1972 by Debbie Eason, the paper was purchased by SouthComm Communications in 2012. In 2017, SouthComm sold the paper to Ben Eason, the son of the original owner.

References

External links
 Creative Loafing

Alternative weekly newspapers published in the United States
Publications established in 1972
Newspapers published in Atlanta